De Jongens tegen de Meisjes (Dutch for The Boys versus the Girls) was a Dutch game show broadcast by RTL 4. The show first aired in 2011 and last aired in 2018.

The show featured a male and a female team participating in various games and quizzes about the differences between men and women. Tijl Beckand was the team captain of the male team since the show first aired and Chantal Janzen was the team captain of the female team, also since the beginning, except in 2018 due to her pregnancy. In this year Yolanthe Sneijder-Cabau replaced her as the team captain of the female team.

Seasons

Season 1

Season 2

Season 3

Season 4

Season 5

Season 6

Season 7

References

External links 
 

2011 Dutch television series debuts
Dutch game shows
RTL 4 original programming